Mantissa College is a private educational establishment founded in 1999 with approval from the Malaysia Education ministry.

History
The institute was founded in 1999 as an IT college and is wholly owned by PMI Education Sdn. Bhd (Reg No. 629638V).

International Presence
Internationally, Mantissa Diploma courses are articulated with 40 Universities from United Kingdom, France, Australia, New Zealand, United States, Canada, Taiwan (Ming Chuan University) and China (Henan University).

Courses offered

 Certificate in English Language (CIEL)
 Diploma in Information Technology (DIT)
 Bachelor of Business Administration
 International Executive Master in Business Administration Programme (IEMBA)
 Doctorate of Business Administration (DBA)

References

Colleges in Malaysia
Universities and colleges in Kuala Lumpur
1999 establishments in Malaysia
Educational institutions established in 1999